Alexander Burr (February 25, 1871 – February 8, 1951) was a justice of the North Dakota Supreme Court from September 1, 1926, to September 15, 1949.

References

Justices of the North Dakota Supreme Court
1871 births
1951 deaths